Acton's Lock is a lock on the Regent's Canal in Haggerston, in the London Borough of Hackney.

See also

Canals of the United Kingdom
History of the British canal system

References

Locks on the Regent's Canal
Geography of the London Borough of Hackney
Buildings and structures in the London Borough of Hackney
Haggerston